EOTW or TEOTW may refer to:
 The Eye of the World (tEotW), a novel by Robert Jordan
 End of the world, survivalist terminology